Alfred John Scow  (born April 10, 1927, in Alert Bay, British Columbia, died Feb 26, 2013) was the first Aboriginal person to graduate from a BC law school, the first Aboriginal lawyer called to the BC bar and the first Aboriginal legally trained judge appointed to the BC Provincial Court.

Judge Scow received numerous awards including the UBC Great Trekker Award, Aboriginal Achievement awards, a UBC Honorary Doctor of Laws Degree, the Order of Canada, and the Order of British Columbia.

While at the University of British Columbia, Scow played for the Thunderbirds soccer team.

Scow was also a hereditary chief of the Kwikwasutinuxw of the Kwakwaka'wakw people.

References

External links
The Scow Institute
Profile of Judge Scow at the National Aboriginal Achievement Foundation

1927 births
2013 deaths
20th-century First Nations people
First Nations judges
Indspire Awards
Judges in British Columbia
Kwakwaka'wakw people
Lawyers in British Columbia
People from Alert Bay
Members of the Order of British Columbia
Members of the Order of Canada
Canadian soccer players
UBC Thunderbirds soccer players
Association footballers not categorized by position